Taiwan Series is the championship series of the Chinese Professional Baseball League (CPBL). It is usually played in late October or early November, after the regular season. It was formerly known as the CPBL Seasonal Championship Series, and was renamed the Taiwan Series after the merger of the CPBL and the Taiwan Major League in 2003.

Qualification
Teams play two sixty-game half seasons. The two half-season winners are automatically the number one and two seeds; the one with the better full-season record gains an automatic berth into the best-of-seven Taiwan Series, played in a 2-2-3 format. The other team must play a best-of-five series against the team with the best full-season record but didn't win either half-season. If the same team wins both halves, the next two teams with the best full-season record play in the first round; the winner plays in the Taiwan Series, with the team that wins both halves having a 2-2-2 format.

Results

See also
 Asia Series
 Chinese Professional Baseball League
 CPBL awards
 Gambling in Taiwan
 List of the nicknames used in the CPBL
 Professional baseball in Taiwan
 Sports in Taiwan
 Taiwan baseball team

External links 
 Chinese Professional Baseball League 
 History of the Chinese Professional Baseball League 
 Taiwanese Baseball Primer 

 
Recurring sporting events established in 1990
1990 establishments in Taiwan